MyMiniFactory is a file distribution platform founded in 2013 and headquartered in London, United Kingdom. The online platform hosts digital creators with a primary focus on hobbyists with an interest in 3D printing.

MyMiniFactory have partnered with Oxfam to solve humanitarian problems using open source design and manufacture.

In June 2018 MyMiniFactory opened an online STL file store where 3D designers can sell 3D printable files.

MyMiniFactory offers to brands the possibility to crowdsource via 3D design competitions. The platform has collaborated with brands such as the Warner Bros Group - Turner's Adventure Time, Rovio's Angry Birds, Autodesk, Google and the Exxon Group.

See also
 3D printing marketplace

References

External links 
 MyMiniFactory

Open content
Social information processing
3D printing websites
Internet properties established in 2013
File sharing communities